Kleinknecht is a German surname, whet 'klein' means small and 'Knecht' servant. Notable people with the surname include:

 Jakob Friedrich Kleinknecht (1722–1794), German composer and flutist
 Kenneth S. Kleinknecht (1919–2007), American engineer
  (born 1940), German physicist

German-language surnames